Adolescence is the second commercial mixtape by British rapper Unknown T. It was released on 30 July 2021 by A Stay Solid Music and Island. It includes guest features from Digga D, M1llionz, Potter Payper, and Nafe Smallz.

Singles and promotion
On 7 January 2021, Unknown T released the single "WW2". On 10 June, the second single "Wonderland" featuring M Huncho was released. On 25 June, he released the third single "Goodums". The release date and title of the mixtape were also announced on 25 June. On 15 July, he released the fourth single "Driller sh!t".

On 5 July 2021, Unknown T unveiled a collaboration with Billionaire Boys Club and PLACES+FACES for his merchandise clothing.

Critical reception
Writing for Clash, Ramy Abou-Setta said "The 15 song tape consists primarily of drill anthems and pleasantries for his targeted audience; he focuses on making his name known, becoming ever-cemented as one of the smoothest drill artists to ever grace the microphone. [...] All of the songs that are featured on the mixtape seem to mesh into one sphere of drill, leaving a desire for a more attention-grabbing track that allows for us to get to see a different side of Unknown T." The writer also said that the mixtape is good enough to cement Unknown T in the UK music scene, and "provides some necessary innovation on to a saturated musical space."

Commercial performance
Upon the mixtape's release, Adolescence debuted at number 8 on the UK Albums Chart with approximately 4,000 equivalent sales first week.

Track listing

Charts

References

2021 mixtape albums